Charles Eugene Banks (April 3, 1852 – April 30, 1932) was an American newspaper editor, journalist, author, novelist, poet, playwright, historian, and orator. Considered a mentor of the Davenport Group of writers in Iowa, he later moved to Seattle. There he was an editor of the Seattle Post-Intelligencer newspaper. He retired to Hawaii.

Biography

Banks was born to Seth Lee and Sarah M. Banks at Lyons in Clinton County, Iowa. Raised on a farm, he was educated by his mother for several years before attending public schools. As a poetically-inclined traveling shoe salesman, Banks began his professional writing career with submissions to a regionally distributed trade journal. He eventually found writing work in Chicago, wherein 1892 he married actress Carrie Wyatt Lounsbury.

Banks returned to Iowa with his wife, and in Davenport, started a journal. There he mentored several young writers, who became known as the Davenport group, including Susan Glaspell, George Cram Cook, and Floyd Dell.

Banks later moved to Seattle, Washington, where he worked as an editor for the Seattle Post-Intelligencer newspaper. He retired to Hawaii. Banks was widowed in 1926. In 1932 he was struck by an automobile and died. His close personal friend, noted attorney Clarence Darrow, delivered Banks' eulogy and served as executor of his estate. According to his obituary, Banks left no surviving offspring.

References

External links

Poetry Collections
 Full text of Quiet Music (1892)
 Full text of Where Brooks Go Softly (1893)

1852 births
1932 deaths
Writers from Clinton, Iowa
Writers from Davenport, Iowa
Poets from Iowa
American male poets
American poets